Altitude FC is a football club based in Independence, Belize. Their semi-professional male team competes in the Premier League of Belize, the highest level of football in the country; their female team, named the Altitude Chicks, compete in the National Amateur Women's League (NAWL). They play their home matches at Michael Ashcroft Stadium in downtown Independence. Altitude FC was founded in 2013 and represents the Mid-South Football Association from the Stann Creek District.

History

Altitude FC was founded in 2013 as a 1st division football club. During their first year, they competed in the Ferguson Cup, an amateur tournament that was held in Placencia. They then competed in the 1st division Banana League tournament. They won a championship in 2018 against Sagitun Farm 8.

Following a lease asgreement with the Placencia Assassins, an existing Premier League of Belize (PLB) franchise from the same region, Altitude FC competed in the 2018–19 season as the Altitude Assassins. After completing a year as Altitude Assassins, the lease with the Placencia Assassins was terminated and they regained their PLB franchise.

In 2019, Altitude FC entered the PLB as a provisional franchise, placing fourth in the 2019–20 Opening Season. In 2020, Altitude was officially inducted in the PLB and given full membership. The season was suspended due to the COVID-19 pandemic and replaced with the FFB Top League, a temporary league organized by the Football Federation of Belize. Altitude finished as runners-up in both seasons of the FFB Top League behind Verdes FC.

The PLB resumed for the 2022–23 season and Altitude won the opening season playoffs against Verdes. The match was tied 1–1 following regulation and extra time and was decided in a penalty shoot-out that ended 11–10.

Stadium

Michael Ashcroft Stadium was built in 1994 as a multipurpose sporting complex in Independence, Belize. It has been host to a number of amateur and semi-professional football clubs over the years, including Sagitun FC, Texmar Boys, and the Placencia Assassins. In 2018, Altitude FC moved to Michael Ashcroft Stadium, which has a seating capacity of 2,500 and is managed by the Independence Sports & Stadium Committee under the Independence Village Council.

Logo

, the club crest for Altitude is a blue shield with yellow stripes. It features the club's name as well as the Belize coat of arms. The yellow stripes represent the region's banana industry.

Current squad

Management

List of managers
 Wilmer Garcia (2021-) Football Federation of Belize
 Hilberto Muschamp (2020-2021) Premier League of Belize
 Hilberto Muschamp (2019-2020) Premier League of Belize
 Renan Couoh (2019-2019) Premier League of Belize
 Wilmer Garcia (2018-2019) Premier League of Belize
 Gabriel Ramos (2017-2018) ISSC Banana League
 Devin Longsworth (2016-2017) ISSC Banana League
 Robbie Cadle (2015-2016) ISSC Banana League
 Robbie Cadle (2014-2015) ISSC Banana League
 John King Sr. (2013-2014) Rodwell Ferguson Cup

References

Football clubs in Belize